Felipe de Sousa Silva (born 3 April 1992), commonly known as Felipe, is a Brazilian footballer who currently plays as a forward for Chengdu Rongcheng F.C.

Club career 
On 2 August 2021, Felipe would join Chinese second tier football club Chengdu Rongcheng. He would be part of the team as the club gained promotion to the top tier at the end of the 2021 league campaign.

Career statistics

Club

Notes

References

External links 

1992 births
Living people
Brazilian footballers
Association football forwards
Guarani Esporte Clube (CE) players
Associação Desportiva São Caetano players
Sociedade Esportiva e Recreativa Caxias do Sul players
Clube Atlético Sorocaba players
Associação Ferroviária de Esportes players
Sertãozinho Futebol Clube players
Clube Atlético Bragantino players
Clube Atlético Votuporanguense players
Vila Nova Futebol Clube players
Gwangju FC players
Campeonato Brasileiro Série B players
K League 2 players
K League 1 players
Brazilian expatriate footballers
Brazilian expatriate sportspeople in South Korea
Expatriate footballers in South Korea
Sportspeople from Piauí